Rukmini Vijayakumar is an Indian dance choreographer, Bharatanatyam dancer, and actress from Bengaluru. Along with her performances on stage, she has appeared in films such as Ananda Thandavam (2009), Bhajarangi (2013), Kochadaiyaan (2014),  Final Cut of Director (2016), Kaatru Veliyidai (2017), and Sita Ramam (2022).

Career
Rukmini Vijayakumar is the artistic director of Raadha Kalpa dance company, and the director of LshVa, an art space. She is the founder of The Raadha Kalpa Method, a pedagogical system of training classical Indian and particularly Bharatanatyam dancer.

Rukmini's approach to Bharatanatyam is dedicated, rigorous and layered. She has presented her work as a soloist all over the world, including venues such as the Jacobs Pillow festival, Drive East NYC, and the Korzo Theater. Recently she played ‘the goddess of love’ in ‘Sukanya’, produced by The Royal Opera house in London. 

She studied Bharatanatyam under Guru Narmada, Guru Padmini Rao and Guru Sundari Santhanam. She practiced the Karanas for several years under Guru Sundari Santhanam, a senior disciple of Guru Padma Subramanyam. Rukmini holds a BFA degree from the Boston Conservatory in Ballet and Modern dance. She has studied acting at the New York Film Academy, Los Angeles while also learning under director Prakash Belawadi during her stay in India. She has studied subjects on Fitness Training at UCLA and Anatomy and Physiology at The Boston University.

Rukmini's process of creation is both traditional and contemporary. She was a recipient of the Jiri Kylian grant for choreography and a resident choreographer at Korzo theater, Netherlands in 2018. Her productions, Nayani, Prabhavati, Abhimata, Talattu and The Dark Lord have toured b India and the world extensively. Her more recent work, Turiya, MALA, The Muse and Unrequited were created within the contemporary idiom and have been appreciated for their creative approach to the bharatanatyam vocabulary. 

She made her debut in Gandhi Krishna's 2009 romantic film Ananda Tandavam as Ratna alongside Siddharth Venugopal and Tamannaah, but the film was a commercial and critical failure. Rukmini then signed up to appear in Naan, once again alongside Siddharth Venugopal, but the film ran into production trouble and she opted against appearing in the film when it began again in 2010. Moreover, another project, Oru Naal Podhuma directed by Pratap Pothan and featuring Madhavan in the lead role, was also cancelled soon after announcement.

In 2012, Rukmini was opted for Rajinikanths sister's role in Kochadaiyaan. The role was earlier to be enacted by Sneha, who opted out citing date issues. In 2016, her delayed Hindi suspense thriller film Final Cut of Director (dubbed in Tamil as Bommalattam) by Bharathiraja released. In the film, she plays Trishna alongside an ensemble cast of Arjun, Nana Patekar and Kajal Aggarwal. The role features her as a mysterious debutant actress who is hidden from the media, with the film eventually revealing that her character was actually a male, made to dress up by the director. The film opened to positive reviews, with critics labelling her performance as "definitely a surprise package".

Personal life
Rukmini is married to Rohan Menon.

Dance productions

Filmography

References

External links

Official website
 Raadha Kalpa in the LshVa Art Space
 

Actresses in Tamil cinema
Living people
Artists from Hyderabad, India
Indian female classical dancers
Performers of Indian classical dance
Bharatanatyam exponents
Dancers from Andhra Pradesh
Actresses from Hyderabad, India
Indian women choreographers
Indian choreographers
21st-century Indian actresses
Actresses in Hindi cinema
Actresses in Kannada cinema
Indian film actresses
Year of birth missing (living people)